Momo is a 1986 fantasy film directed by Johannes Schaaf and based on the 1973 novel Momo by Michael Ende. It is about the concept of time and how it is used by humans in modern societies. The film features the final acting role of actor / writer / director John Huston.

Synopsis

In the ruins of an amphitheatre just outside an unnamed Italian city lives Momo, a little girl of mysterious origin. She is remarkable in the neighbourhood because she has the extraordinary ability to listen—really listen. By simply being with people and listening to them, she can help them find answers to their problems, make up with each other, and think of fun games.

This pleasant atmosphere is spoiled by the arrival of the Men in Grey. These strange individuals represent the Timesavings Bank and promote the idea of timesaving among the population, time which can be deposited to the Bank and returned to the client later with interest. In reality, the more time people save, the less they have. The time they save is actually lost to them, consumed by the Men in Grey. Momo, however, is a wrench in the plans of the Timesaving Bank thanks to her special personality.

Cast 
 Radost Bokel - Momo
 Leopoldo Trieste - Beppo
 Bruno Stori - Gigi
 Mario Adorf - Nicola
 Armin Mueller-Stahl - leader of grey men
 John Huston - Meister Hora
 Concetta Russino - Liliana
 Sylvester Groth - agent BLW/553 X
 Ninetto Davoli - Nino
 Francesco De Rosa - Herr Fusi
 Elide Melli - Frau Daria
 Michael Ende - train passenger (writer of the story told by Master Hora)

Author involvement
This film was a German-Italian co-production in which Michael Ende himself played the role of the passenger in the train (who is told the story by Master Hora and writes it down). It appears that Ende, unhappy with how the film based on The Neverending Story did not follow the spirit of the book faithfully enough, requested to be involved more directly in filming Momo.

External links
Momo trailer

1986 films
1986 fantasy films
German fantasy films
Italian fantasy films
German children's films
West German films
Films based on children's books
Films based on fantasy novels
Films based on German novels
Films directed by Johannes Schaaf
Films produced by Horst Wendlandt
Films set in Italy
Films about time
1980s Italian films
1980s German films